Armando Alfonso González (born 1910, date of death unknown) was a Mexican hurdler. He competed in the men's 400 metres hurdles at the 1932 Summer Olympics.

References

External links
 

1910 births
Year of death missing
Athletes (track and field) at the 1932 Summer Olympics
Mexican male hurdlers
Olympic athletes of Mexico
Athletes from Mexico City